Forbidden fruit is a name given to the fruit growing in the Garden of Eden which God commands mankind not to eat. In the biblical story, Adam and Eve eat the fruit from the tree of the knowledge of good and evil and are exiled from Eden.

As a metaphor outside of the Abrahamic religions the phrase typically refers to any indulgence or pleasure that is considered illegal or immoral.

Biblical story

The story of the Book of Genesis places the first man and woman, Adam and Eve, in the Garden of Eden where they may eat the fruit of many trees, but are forbidden by God to eat from the tree of knowledge of good and evil.

In Genesis 3, a serpent tempts the woman:

Desiring this knowledge, the woman eats the forbidden fruit and gives some to the man who also eats it. They become aware of their "nakedness" and make fig-leaf clothes, and hide themselves when God approaches. When confronted, Adam tells God that Eve gave him the fruit to eat, and Eve tells God the serpent deceived her into eating it. God then curses the serpent, the woman then the man, and expels the man and woman from the Garden before they ate of the tree of eternal life.

Quranic story

According to the Quran, Surah Al-A'raf 7:19 describes Adam and his wife in Paradise where they may eat what is provided, except for one Tree they must not eat from, lest they be considered Ẓālimūn (wrongdoers).

Surah Al-A'raf 7:20–22 describes  who whispers to Adam and his wife and deceives them. When they taste of the tree, their shame becomes manifest to them and they begin to cover themselves with leaves.

Gnostic story
A Gnostic interpretation of the story proposes that it was the archons who created Adam and attempted to prevent him from eating the forbidden fruit in order to keep him in a state of ignorance, after the spiritual form of Eve entered the Tree of the Knowledge of Good and Evil while leaving a physical version of herself with Adam once she awakened him. But the forces of the heavenly realm (Pleroma) send the serpent as a representative of the divine sphere to reveal to Adam and Eve the evil intentions of their creators. The serpent succeeds in convincing them to eat the fruit and become like gods, capable of distinguishing between good and evil.

Identifications and depictions
The word fruit appears in Hebrew as פֶּ֫רִי (pərî ). As to which fruit may have been the forbidden fruit of the Garden of Eden, possibilities include apple, grape, pomegranate,  fig,  carob, etrog or citron, pear, quince, and mushrooms. The pseudepigraphic Book of Enoch describes the tree of knowledge: "It was like a species of the Tamarind tree, bearing fruit which resembled grapes extremely fine; and its fragrance extended to a considerable distance. I exclaimed, How beautiful is this tree, and how delightful is its appearance!" (1 Enoch 31:4).

In Islamic tradition, the fruit is commonly either identified with wheat or with grapevine.

Apple

In Western Europe, the fruit was often depicted as an apple. This was possibly because of a misunderstanding of – or a pun on – two unrelated words mălum, a native Latin noun which means evil (from the adjective malus), and mālum, another Latin noun, borrowed from Greek μῆλον, which means apple. In the Vulgate, Genesis 2:17 describes the tree as de ligno autem scientiae boni et mali : "but of the tree [literally wood ] of knowledge of good and evil" (mali here is the genitive of malum).
According to the Bible, there is nothing to show the forbidden fruit of the tree of knowledge was necessarily an apple. 

The larynx, specifically the laryngeal prominence that joins the thyroid cartilage, in the human throat is noticeably more prominent in males and was consequently called an Adam's apple, from a notion that it was caused by the forbidden fruit getting stuck in Adam's throat as he swallowed it.

Grape
Rabbi Meir says that the fruit was a grape, made into wine. The Zohar explains similarly that Noah attempted (but failed) to rectify the sin of Adam by using grape wine for holy purposes. The midrash of Bereishit Rabah states that the fruit was grape, or squeezed grapes (perhaps alluding to wine). Chapter 4 of 3 Baruch, also known as the Greek Apocalypse of Baruch, designates the fruit as the grape. 3 Baruch is a first to third century text that is either Christian or Jewish with Christian interpolations.

Fig

The Bible states in the book of Genesis that Adam and Eve had made their own fig leaf clothing: "And the eyes of them both were opened, and they knew that they were naked; and they sewed fig-leaves together, and made themselves girdles". Rabbi Nehemiah Hayyun supports the idea that the fruit was a fig, as it was from fig leaves that God made garments for Adam and Eve upon expelling them from the Garden. "By that with which they were made low were they rectified." Since the fig is a long-standing symbol of female sexuality, it enjoyed a run as a favorite understudy to the apple as the forbidden fruit during the Italian Renaissance, Michelangelo Buonarroti depicting it as such in his masterpiece fresco on the Sistine Chapel ceiling.

Pomegranate
Proponents of the theory that the Garden of Eden was located somewhere in what is now known as the Middle East suggest that the fruit was actually a pomegranate, a plant indigenous from Iran to the Himalayas and cultivated since ancient times. The association of the pomegranate with knowledge of the underworld as provided in the Ancient Greek legend of Persephone may also have given rise to an association with knowledge of the otherworld, tying-in with knowledge that is forbidden to mortals. Also, it is believed Hades offered Persephone a pomegranate to force her to stay with him in the underworld. Hades is the Greek god of the underworld and the Bible states that whoever eats the forbidden fruit shall die.

Wheat
Rabbi Yehuda proposes that the fruit was wheat, because "a baby does not know to call its mother and father until it tastes the taste of grain."

In Hebrew, wheat is "khitah", which has been considered to be a pun on "khet", meaning "sin".

Although commonly confused with a seed, in the study of botany a wheat berry is technically a simple fruit known as a caryopsis, which has the same structure as an apple. Just as an apple is a fleshy fruit that contains seeds, a grain is a dry fruit that absorbs water and contains a seed. The confusion comes from the fact that the fruit of a grass happens to have a form similar to some seeds.

Mushroom

A fresco in the 13th-century Plaincourault Abbey in France depicts Adam and Eve in the Garden of Eden, flanking a Tree of Knowledge that has the appearance of a gigantic Amanita muscaria, a psychoactive mushroom.
Terence McKenna proposed that the forbidden fruit was a reference to psychotropic plants and fungi, specifically psilocybin mushrooms, which he theorized played a central role in the evolution of the human brain. Earlier, in a well-documented but heavily criticized study, John M. Allegro proposed the mushroom as the forbidden fruit.

Banana
Several proponents of the theory exist dating from the thirteenth century. 
In Nathan HaMe’ati's 13th century translation of Maimonides's work The Medical Aphorisms of Moses, the banana is called the "apple of eden". In the sixteenth century, Menahem Lonzano considered it common knowledge in Syria and Egypt that the banana was the apple of Eden.

Coco de mer
Charles George Gordon identified the forbidden fruit of the tree of knowledge with the coco de mer.

Parallel concepts

Greek mythology
The similarities of the story to the story of Pandora's box were identified by early Christians such as Tertullian, Origen, and Gregory of Nazianzus.

See also
 Grapefruit, originally named the "forbidden fruit" of Barbados.
 Medieval popular Bible
 Ningishzida
 Pomme D'Adammo
 Serpent Seed

References

External links
 – English–Hebrew comparison at mechon-mamre.org

Adam and Eve
Apples in culture
Bereshit (parashah)
Biblical topics
Christian terminology
English-language idioms
Garden of Eden
Jewish mythology
Mythological food and drink